Belén Cuesta Llamas (born 24 January 1984) is a Spanish actress. She rose to prominence for her performance as Magüi in comedy series Paquita Salas. She won the Goya Award for Best Actress for her leading performance in drama film The Endless Trench (2019).

Early life
Belén Cuesta Llamas was born on 24 January 1984 in Seville, Spain. She moved to Málaga and her childhood and adolescence was spent in Fuengirola, where she studied at the Escuela Superior de Arte Dramático. She currently resides in Madrid.

Career 
Cuesta is mostly known as a theatre actress. She has participated in both film and television productions as well as television commercials.

She made her television debut in Cazadores de hombres. She starred in comedy series Paquita Salas. Her role as Magüi Moreno, assistant to the title character in the aforementioned series, earned her great popularity with some of her lines becoming viral.

She featured in Money Heist as Manila (a transgender woman and Denver's cousin), initially passing as a hostage in the Bank of Spain, later disclosed to be a member of the band of robbers.

Personal life 
Since 2012, Cuesta has been in a relationship with actor Tamar Novas, whom she met during the filming of Bandolera.

Credits

Theater

Television

Movies

Television programs

Accolades

References

External links 
 

1984 births
Living people
People from Seville
Spanish film actresses
Spanish television actresses
21st-century Spanish actresses
Actresses from Andalusia